One third of Carlisle City Council in Cumbria, England, is elected each year, followed by one year without election. Since the last boundary changes in 1999, 52 councillors have been elected from 22 wards.

Political control
Since the first election to the council in 1973 political control of the council has been held by the following parties:

Leadership
The leaders of the council since 1999 have been:

Council elections
Summary of the council composition after recent council elections, click on the year for full details of each election. Boundary changes took place for the 1999 election which increased the number of seats by one, leading to the whole council being elected in that year.

1973 Carlisle City Council election
1976 Carlisle City Council election
1979 Carlisle City Council election
1983 Carlisle City Council election (New ward boundaries)
1984 Carlisle City Council election (City boundary changes took place but the number of seats remained the same)
1986 Carlisle City Council election
1987 Carlisle City Council election
1988 Carlisle City Council election
1990 Carlisle City Council election (City boundary changes took place but the number of seats remained the same)
1991 Carlisle City Council election

District result maps

By-election results
By-elections occur when seats become vacant between council elections. Below is a summary of recent by-elections; full by-election results can be found by clicking on the by-election name.

A detailed breakdown of recent by elections can be found below:

References

External links
Carlisle City Council

 
Council elections in Cumbria